Keston Wee Hing Natsuo Hiura (born August 2, 1996) is an American professional baseball first baseman and second baseman for the Milwaukee Brewers of Major League Baseball (MLB).

Hiura was born in Santa Clarita, California and attended Valencia High School. He later played three seasons of college baseball at the University of California, Irvine, earning conference accolades and spending time with the United States collegiate national team in the offseason. Hiura forewent his final year of college eligibility and signed with the Brewers after they selected him in the first round of the 2017 Major League Baseball draft.

Hiura spent three seasons in the Brewers farm system and was acclaimed as the organization's top prospect by his second minor league season. In 2019, he made his major league debut and posted a .303 batting average in 84 games. In the following three seasons, Hiura's statistics regressed, including a National League (NL)-leading 85 strikeouts in 2020 and a .168 batting average in 2021.

Career

Amateur career
Hiura attended Valencia High School in Valencia, Santa Clarita, California. Playing for the school's baseball team, Hiura batted .500 with 14 home runs and 30 runs batted in (RBIs) in his senior year as the Vikings won the Foothill League.

Undrafted out of high school, Hiura played college baseball at University of California, Irvine for the Anteaters. As a freshman in 2015, he hit .330 with a .392 on-base percentage (OBP), a .520 slugging percentage (SLG), seven home runs, and 52 RBIs over 56 games. As a sophomore in 2016, he hit .358 with a .436 OBP, .559 SLG, seven home runs, and 41 RBIs over 53 games. After the season, Hiura played for the United States collegiate national team. In his junior year, Hiura batted .442 with a .567 OBP. He was named Big West Conference Player of the Year.

Professional career
The Milwaukee Brewers selected Hiura in the first round, with the ninth overall selection, in the 2017 Major League Baseball draft. He signed and was assigned to the Arizona Brewers of the Rookie-level Arizona League, and after batting .435 with four home runs, 18 RBIs and a 1.339 OPS in 15 games, was promoted to the Wisconsin Timber Rattlers of the Class A Midwest League where he finished the season, posting a .333 batting average with 15 RBIs and seven walks in 27 games.

MLB.com ranked Hiura as Milwaukee's top prospect going into the 2018 season. He began the 2018 season with the Carolina Mudcats of the Class A-Advanced Carolina League and was promoted to the Biloxi Shuckers of the Class AA Southern League on June 1 after hitting .320 with seven home runs, 23 RBIs, and a .911 OPS in 50 games for Carolina. Hiura also won the 2018 Arizona Fall League MVP Hiura finished the year with Biloxi, batting .272 with six home runs, twenty RBIs, and 11 stolen bases in 73 games.

Hiura began 2019 with the San Antonio Missions. On May 14, his contract was selected and he was called up to the major leagues. He made his major league debut on May 14 versus the Philadelphia Phillies.

On June 3, 2019, despite a strong showing in the majors, Hiura was sent back down to AAA to the San Antonio Missions in order to make room for Travis Shaw. Hiura returned to the Brewers on June 28 along with infielder Tyler Saladino, as Shaw returned to AAA and utility player Hernán Pérez was designated for assignment. On July 28, Hiura homered in the bottom of the 10th inning against the Chicago Cubs for his first career walk-off hit. In 2019, on defense he led all major league second basemen in errors, with 16.

In the pandemic-shortened 2020 season, Hiura batted .212/.297/.410 with 13 home runs and 32 RBIs in 59 games. He led the National League in strikeouts (85), as well as putouts (66) and errors (16) by a second baseman.

On January 13, 2023, Hiura agreed to a one-year, $2.2 million contract with the Brewers, avoiding salary arbitration.

Personal life 
Hiura was born to a Chinese mother and a Japanese father. He grew up a Los Angeles Dodgers fan.

References

External links

UC Irvine Anteaters bio

1996 births
Living people
All-American college baseball players
American baseball players of Chinese descent
American baseball players of Japanese descent
Arizona League Brewers players
Baseball outfielders
Baseball players from California
Biloxi Shuckers players
Carolina Mudcats players
Major League Baseball second basemen
Milwaukee Brewers players
Nashville Sounds players
People from Valencia, Santa Clarita, California
Peoria Javelinas players
San Antonio Missions players
Sportspeople from Santa Clarita, California
UC Irvine Anteaters baseball players
Wisconsin Timber Rattlers players